Walter Millard Fleming (1838 – 1913) was a prominent physician and surgeon.

He obtained a degree in medicine in Albany, New York, in 1862. During the Civil War, he was a surgeon with the 13th New York Infantry Brigade, a militia unit of what would later be called the National Guard.

He then practiced medicine in Rochester, New York, until 1868, when he moved to New York City and became a leading practitioner.

He was also co-founder of the Shriners, a Masonic body, along with William J. Florence.  Fleming is listed as member #1 in the 1904 Report of Mecca Temple, New York City.

See also 
 Shriners
 Parade to Glory by Fred Van Deventer
 History of the Imperial Council Nobles of the Mystic Shrine by William B. Melish

References
Mecca Temple, New York, N.Y. [Annual] Reports, December, 1904 (Kellogg Co. printers, Pearl St. NY)

1838 births
1913 deaths
Union Army surgeons
Shriners
People of New York (state) in the American Civil War
Physicians from New York City
19th-century American physicians
20th-century American physicians
20th-century surgeons